Gretchen Magers was the defending champion but lost in the quarterfinals to Sara Gomer.

Patty Fendick won in the final 6–3, 7–6 against Gomer.

Seeds
A champion seed is indicated in bold text while text in italics indicates the round in which that seed was eliminated. The top eight seeds received a bye to the second round.

  Patty Fendick (champion)
  Anne Minter (second round)
  Terry Phelps (quarterfinals)
  Gretchen Magers (quarterfinals)
  Beverly Bowes (semifinals)
  Elizabeth Minter (second round)
  Sara Gomer (final)
  Ann Devries (third round)
  Belinda Cordwell (third round)
  Pam Casale (first round)
  Susan Mascarin (third round)
  Sandra Wasserman (quarterfinals)
  Angeliki Kanellopoulou (second round)
  Louise Field (first round)
 n/a
 n/a

Draw

Finals

Top half

Section 1

Section 2

Bottom half

Section 3

Section 4

External links
 1988 Nutri-Metics Open draw

1988 Singles
1988 WTA Tour